Mads may refer to:

Mads (given name)
MADS Theatre, in England
 MADS-box, a family of genes and proteins
 Metadata Authority Description Schema, a schema used in the library community